Iraklis Sakellaropoulos (born 1 March 1888, date of death unknown) was a Greek long-distance runner. He competed in the marathon at the 1912, 1920 and 1924 Summer Olympics.

References

External links
 

1888 births
Year of death missing
Greek male long-distance runners
Greek male marathon runners
Olympic athletes of Greece
Athletes (track and field) at the 1912 Summer Olympics
Athletes (track and field) at the 1920 Summer Olympics
Athletes (track and field) at the 1924 Summer Olympics
People from İzmir
Smyrniote Greeks
Greeks from the Ottoman Empire
Sportspeople from İzmir
Emigrants from the Ottoman Empire to Greece